Arnault Branch is a stream in Washington County, Missouri. It is a tributary of Mineral Fork.

Arnault Branch derives its name from Philippe Francois Renault, an early businessperson in the local lead-mining industry. A variant name is "Arnault Creek".

See also
List of rivers of Missouri

References

Rivers of Washington County, Missouri
Rivers of Missouri